The Paris Basin is one of the major geological regions of France. It developed since the Triassic over remnant uplands of the Variscan orogeny (Hercynian orogeny).  The sedimentary basin, no longer a single drainage basin, is a large sag in the craton, bordered by the Armorican Massif to the west, the Ardennes-Brabant axis to the north, the Massif des Vosges to the east, and the Massif Central to the south.

Extent
The region usually regarded as the Paris Basin is rather smaller than the area formed by the geological structure. The former occupies the centre of the northern half of the country, excluding Eastern France. The latter extends from the hills just south of Calais to Poitiers and from Caen to the brink of the middle Rhine Valley, east of Saarbrücken.

Geography
The landscape is one of very broad valleys (flood plains), modest watershed hills and well-drained plateaux of comparatively little altitude. In the south-east and east the plain of Champagne and the Seuil de Bourgogne (Threshold of Burgundy) differential erosion of the strata has left low scarps with the dip slopes towards the centre. The varying nature of the clays, limestones and chalk gives rise to the characteristics of the regions such as Champagne Humide (Damp Champagne), Champagne Pouilleuse (poor Champagne), the Pays de Caux and the Pays de Bray.

Due to the millions of years of later deposition, erosion and other changes since, five drainage basins today drain almost all of the Basin.  

These are two flowing north, the basins/specified parts of basins as follows:
upper Moselle and upper Meuse
And three flowing west, the:
Seine basin, central Loire basin and Somme.

Structure
The Paris Basin is a geological basin of sedimentary rocks. It overlies geological strata folded by the Variscan orogeny.

It forms a broad shallow bowl in which marine deposits from throughout periods from the Triassic to the Pliocene were laid down. Their extent generally decreases with time. Based on analysis of fossils recognized in the basin's strata during the 1820s and 1830s, the pioneering geologist Charles Lyell divided the Tertiary into three ages he named the Pliocene, the Miocene and the Eocene.

To the west, the strata folded by the Variscan rise below the more recent marine deposits in the hills of Brittany and, to the east, the Ardennes, Hunsrück and Vosges. To the south, the basin borders on the Massif Central and the Morvan. To the north, its early strata match those of the bed of the English Channel and south-eastern England. Other boundaries lie on ridges in more recent deposits and scarps (escarpments). These include the Côte d'Or in the south-east (on an Alpine fault line) and, at a north end, the Hills of  Artois which overlie the margin of London-Brabant Massif.

Oil Fields
Two notable oil fields are the Chaunoy Field, the other is the Villeperdue Field. They are centred at about 1850 metre depth.

See also
 Geologic time scale
 List of fossil sites (with link directory)

References

Anon. Carte Géologique de la France à l'Échelle du Millionième 

Paleozoic France
Geography of France
Sedimentary basins of Europe